The ICC World Cricket League Championship was the top division of the World Cricket League (WCL). It formed the qualification process for the Cricket World Cup.

The WCL Championship was originally known as World Cricket League Division One, and was played twice under that name (in 2007 and 2010). Those were hosted as standalone tournaments, but a new format was subsequently introduced in which competing teams play multiple games against each other over several years (mirroring the Intercontinental Cup, a first-class competition). All matches in the WCL Championship hold List A status, while matches between higher-ranking teams hold One Day International (ODI) status.

History

The first WCL Division One tournament in 2007 featured the top six teams from the 2005 ICC Trophy, while the 2010 tournament featured the top six teams from the 2009 World Cup Qualifier. Two teams from WCL Division Two were added for the 2011–13 WCL Championship, making eight teams in total. The top two teams from the 2011–13 competition (Ireland and Afghanistan) gained automatic qualification for the 2015 World Cup. They were subsequently promoted to the ICC ODI Championship, although the 2015–17 WCL Championship remained an eight-team competition as two additional teams were promoted from Division Two.

Results

Performance by team
Legend
 – Champions
 – Runners-up
 – Third place
Q – Qualified

Player statistics

See also
 ICC Six Nations Challenge, a similar tournament predating the World Cricket League

References

Division 2